Plectrohyla matudai (common name: Matuda's spikethumb frog) is a species of frog in the family Hylidae. It is found along the Pacific slopes from southeastern Oaxaca, Mexico, through Chiapas and south-central Guatemala (Las Nubes range); also in the Grijalva Depression in western Guatemala and on Cerro Azul in northwestern Honduras.

Etymology
Norman Hartweg named this species after Eizi Matuda, Japanese–Mexican botanist and his host in Chiapas.

Description
The type series consists of three males (including the holotype) and two females. Males measured  and females  in snout–vent length. The head and dorsal surface of body are dark grayish brown, while the sides are lighter but posteriorly mottled with black. Males have bifurcate, rudimentary prepollex (the "spikethumb").

Habitat and conservation
It is typically found in low vegetation with abundant leaf litter along small mountain streams.

Plectrohyla matudai is locally common, and in Guatemala it is one of the most common stream-breeding frogs. It is threatened by habitat loss and disturbance. Chytridiomycosis is also a potential threat, although it seems relatively resistant to it, at least as an adult. Its distribution includes several protected areas.

References

matudai
Amphibians of Guatemala
Amphibians of Honduras
Amphibians of Mexico
Amphibians described in 1941
Taxa named by Norman Edouard Hartweg
Taxonomy articles created by Polbot